Robinson Sucroe (also known as Robinson Sucroë in French) is an animated series created by France Animation in France and Cinar (now known as WildBrain) in Canada. In 2009, it was found to have infringed Claude Robinson's work Les aventures de Robinson Curiosité.

The series first aired on 17 January 1994 on Canal+, and ended on 21 January 1995 on Canal Famille and later on YTV, with reruns until 1998. The series originally aired in French, with the English version also being produced by Cinar. In the United States, the English version aired on the Cookie Jar Toons block on This TV from 2008 to 2009.

Plot
Robinson Sucroe is a janitor at the famous newspaper, the New York Herald. He is sent by the head editor Mr. Floydd to a dangerous deserted island to write stories for the paper every week, much to the annoyance of famous reporter Julian Uglyston.

Robinson reaches an island called Crab Island, but it is not dangerous and deserted as it seems. It is actually the home to a shipwrecked group of people called the Everydays and two rival legions of pirates.

Robinson, with his right-hand man Mr. Wednesday, write embellished reports about the island's dangers, to keep visitors away. But Uglyston knows the truth and tries many unsuccessful attempts to prove to Mr. Floydd that Robinson is lying.

Characters
Robinson Sucroe: The main protagonist, a young man from colonial New York City who travels to the supposedly deserted Crab Island. His name is a play on the literary character Robinson Crusoe and the French word "sucre", meaning "sugar", which describes Sucroe's kindness.
Mr. Floydd: The manager of The New York Herald. He's known to be stubborn, arrogant, and a hot-head, which is part of the reason he won't believe Uglyston's stories about Robinson.
Julian Uglyston: (Known as Grumbleston in the English dub) Robinson Sucroe's former coworker. Uglyston was the most successful author at The New York Herald until Robinson left for Crab Island and wrote his stories. Because of Uglyston's jealousy, he attempts to prove to Mr. Floydd that Robinson is telling lies in the stories.

The Everydays
Wednesday: Sucroe's ever so loyal friend and partner, he is the one who truly writes the stories for The New York Herald. He's also the leader of Crab Island alongside his parents.
Dure Soiree: (Known as Morning Glory in the English dub) Wednesday's mother and the “leader” of Crab Island. She's easily upset and very hot tempered, although having a soft spot for her son. When first meeting Robinson, she had a strong affection for him, which quickly wore out. She's also tone deaf, which makes her think she can sing very well, although her singing causes rainstorms.
Dimanche Midi: (Known as Saturday Night in the English dub) Wednesday's father and Dure Soiree's husband, he's the real leader of the Everydays. A complete opposite of his wife, Dimanche is very calm and patient, with an affinity for playing sports.
Petite Vacance: (Known as Tuesday in the English dub) A preteen girl on Crab Island, she's close friends with Wednesday and Robinson. She's coy and a bit of a prankster, but is generally kind. She also likes to sing, but because she is tone deaf (like Dure Soiree), she thinks she's an amazing singer when in reality she's not.
Monday: (Known as Thursday in the English dub) Wednesday's sister and Petite Vacance's mother (the two are sisters in English). She captures the attraction of everyone, both Everyday and Pirate.

The English Pirates
Captain Briske: (Known as Captain Percy in the English dub) The captain of English pirates, he and his crew members (except for Little Jim) speak in an overdramatic heavy English accent and are usually seen drinking tea. He is always in a childish feud with Captain Courticuisse of the French pirates.
Little Jim: (Known as Little Jimmy in the English dub) An English child pirate, he's Petite Vacance's "boyfriend". He doesn't talk as much as the others and rarely takes charge of a situation.

The French Pirates
Captain Courtecuisse: (Known as Captain Beaujolais in the English dub) The captain of the French pirates, he and his crew mates are brash yet spineless. He constantly fights with Captain Briske.

Reoccurring Characters
Coco: (Known as Polly in the English dub) Uglyston's pet parrot. She usually accompanies him during his schemes. Uglyston considers her very intelligent and treats her better than people.
Captain Boumier: (Known as Captain Boomerang in the English dub) The captain of the New York Herald's ship. He's very naive, believing everything that's told to him.
Gladys Floydd: Mr Floydd's beautiful but ditsy daughter who also works at the New York Herald. She knows about the Everydays on Crab Island and keeps it a secret.
The Spanish Pirates: A group of Spanish conquistadors. Unlike the English and French pirates, they are always pillaging other ships. Both pirate groups try to get their hands on the Spanish's gold without success.

Episode List

Voices
English Cast

A.J. Henderson: Robinson Sucroe
Gary Jewell: Wednesday
Rick Jones: Mr. Floydd, Captain Briske 
Terrence Scammell: Uglyston
Kathleen Fee: Dure Soiree
Arthur Holden: Dimanche Midi
Pauline Little: Petite Vacance
Bronwen Mantel: Monday
Susan Glover: Little Jim
Richard Dumont: Captain Courticuisse, Additional Voices

French Cast

Franck de Lapersonne: Robinson Sucroe 
Gérard Rinaldi: Wednesday 
Michel Modo: Mr. Floydd
Gérard Suruge: Uglyston
Jane Val: Dure Soiree, Monday
Jean-Claude Montalban: Dimanche Midi, Captain Briske, Little Jim
Annabelle Roux: Petite Vacance
Jean-François Kopf: Captain Courticuisse

Copyright infringement 

In 2009, Quebec Superior Court Justice Claude Auclair, in a 240-page decision, awarded Claude Robinson $5.2 million in damages. In the 1990s, Cinar, later renamed Cookie Jar Entertainment, copied the work Robinson had previously unsuccessfully presented to them in the 1980s. The company appealed the decision.

As of December 23, 2013, the Supreme Court of Canada, in a unanimous decision, affirmed the judgment in favor of Robinson. In the final judgement, Cinar Corp. will have to reimburse part of the fees incurred by Robinson and this also includes 4 million Canadian dollars in damages. This judgement ended an 18-year battle between Claude Robinson and the Cinar Corp.

References

External links 

1990s French animated television series
1995 French television series debuts
1995 French television series endings
1990s Canadian animated television series
1995 Canadian television series debuts
1995 Canadian television series endings
Television series by Cookie Jar Entertainment
French children's animated comedy television series
Canadian children's animated comedy television series
BBC children's television shows
Television shows involved in plagiarism controversies